Hungary competed at the 1906 Intercalated Games in Athens, Greece. 35 athletes, all men, competed in 41 events in 7 sports.

Athletics

Track

Field

Fencing

Gymnastics

Shooting

Swimming

Tennis

Wrestling

Greco-Roman

References

Nations at the 1906 Intercalated Games
1906
Intercalated Games